Tianqiao station is a station on Line 8 of the Beijing Subway. It was opened on December 30, 2018.

Station Layout 
The station has an underground island platform.

Exits 
There are 4 exits: lettered A, B, C, and D.

References 
 Beijing Subway official map, showing official English name

Beijing Subway stations in Dongcheng District
Beijing Subway stations in Xicheng District